Raopura is one of the 182 Legislative Assembly constituencies of Gujarat state in India. It is part of Vadodara district. Rajendra Trivedi A.K.A. Rajubhai Vakil was elected the MLA in the 2017 Vidhansabha elections. He is currently the Speaker of Gujarat Legislative Assembly.

List of segments

This assembly seat represents the following segments,

 Vadodara Taluka (Part) – Vadodara Municipal Corporation (Part) Ward No. – 1, 3, 8, Sama (OG) 14, Chhani (OG) 19.

Members of Legislative Assembly

Election results

2022

2017

2012

2007

2002

See also
 List of constituencies of Gujarat Legislative Assembly
 Gujarat Legislative Assembly

References

External links
 

Assembly constituencies of Gujarat
Vadodara district